The Shamus Award is awarded by the Private Eye Writers of America (PWA) for the best detective fiction (P. I. = Private investigator) genre novels and short stories of the year.

The Prize is given annually to recognize outstanding achievement in private eye fiction. Starting in 2003, the Shamus Awards are sometimes (2003, 2007–2009, 2011–2016) announced during the Bouchercon World Mystery Convention, at the convention's PWA Awards Banquet.

Categories

Winners

Best P. I. Hardcover Novel

Best First P. I. Novel

Best P. I. Paperback Original

THE EYE – Lifetime Achievement Award
(Not awarded in 1989, 1990, 1996, 1998, 2001, 2012, 2014, 2019 and 2020)

Best P. I. Series Character – The Hammer

Best Indie P.I. Novel

References

Awards established in 1982
Mystery and detective fiction awards
American literary awards
 
Shamus Award winners
Shamus Award-winning works
1982 establishments in the United States